The Kaçkar Mountains, formerly known as the Lazistan Mountains or the Mountains of Khaghtik, are a mountain range that rises above the Black Sea coast in northeastern Turkey.

The Kaçkars are glaciated mountains that are alpine in character, with steep rocky peaks and numerous mountain lakes. The area was declared a national park in 1994. Recreational activities in the park include hiking, camping, mountaineering, and, increasingly, heliskiing.

Geography and etymology

The name Kaçkar (from Armenian khachkar (Խաչքար) literally meaning "cross stone") may be used in various senses. It may describe the whole mountain range, including the many mountain groups, or it may just describe the Kaçkar-Kavron group with its highest peak, or just the highest peak itself. The local name of the highest peak or its mountain group Kaçkar Dağı translates to Kaçkar Mountain, and the name of the range Kaçkar Dağları translates to Kaçkar Mountains.

On the south and east, the Kaçkar Mountains are bordered by the Çoruh river valley; on the north, by the Black Sea coast.

Major mountain groups
Altıparmak group
Kavron (or Kaçkar-Kavron)
Verçenik group

Trekking 
Kaçkar Mountains are one of the best trekking sites in Turkey. Kaçkars have two ideal trekking routes. The first is from the Black Sea side; the path is clear and it is easy to trek, while the Çoruh side is more difficult and hazardous. 
Kaçkar Mountains are cold and have glaciers, hence ice axes and crampons are required. The best time for trekking is between June and September.

See also
Rize
Çağlayan River

References

External links
 Hiking and Climbing Routes, GPS sources

Mountain ranges of Turkey
National parks of Turkey
Black Sea Region
Landforms of Rize Province
Tourist attractions in Rize Province